Gimli is a  mountain summit located in the Valhalla Ranges of the Selkirk Mountains in British Columbia, Canada. Gimli is the sixth-highest point in the Valhalla Ranges, with the highest being Gladsheim Peak,  to the north-northwest.

History
The name "Valhalla Mountains" first appeared in George Mercer Dawson's Geological Survey of Canada map published in 1890. Dawson applied names derived from Scandinavian mythology to several of the mountain ranges and peaks in Southern Kootenay. This landform's toponym was officially adopted as "Mount Dag" on March 3, 1971, at the request of the Kootenay Mountaineering Club, but it was officially changed to Gimli on April 29, 1998, by the Geographical Names Board of Canada at the request of local residents. According to Norse mythology, Gimli is the place where the righteous survivors of Ragnarök (doomsday when heaven and earth are destroyed) are foretold to live.

Climate
Based on the Köppen climate classification, Gimli has a subarctic climate with cold, snowy winters, and mild summers. Winter temperatures can drop below −20 °C with wind chill factors below −30 °C. Precipitation runoff from the mountain drains into tributaries of the Slocan River.

See also

List of mountains in Canada
Geography of British Columbia

References

External links
 Weather forecast: Gimli
 Gimli (photo): PBase
 Gimli (photo): PBase

Two-thousanders of British Columbia
Selkirk Mountains
Kootenay Land District